The 65th Grey Cup, also known as The Ice Bowl, was played on November 27, 1977, at Montreal's Olympic Stadium. The hometown Montreal Alouettes defeated the Edmonton Eskimos by a score of 41–6.

Game Summary

The 1977 Grey Cup was Canada's version of the Ice Bowl, as the playing surface was more ideal for ice hockey than football. A blizzard hit Montreal two days prior to the game, and stadium crews salted the field to melt the snow. But when the temperature plunged the next day, the melted snow turned into a sheet of ice. To combat the conditions, many Alouette players affixed staples to the bottom of their shoes in order to get good traction. This move was spearheaded by star defender Tony Proudfoot. The game was the third Grey Cup meeting in four years between the Alouettes and the Edmonton Eskimos. With a record Grey Cup crowd of 68,318 at Montreal's Olympic Stadium, the home team did not disappoint in a 41-6 rout over their Western rivals.

Sonny Wade completed 22 of 40 passes for 340 yards and three touchdowns. He was intercepted once. Montreal had a total offence of 424 yards, making 21 first downs. The Eskimos were held to just 102 yards and turned the ball over 10 times, six times in the first half alone. The kicking game carried over from the 1975 Grey Cup as both Montreal's Don Sweet and Edmonton's Dave Cutler scored all the points in the first half. Sweet was good on three field goal attempts and missed on one for a single point. With Edmonton trailing 10-0, Cutler finally put the Eskimos on the scoreboard on the final play of the second quarter, connecting on a nine-yard field goal. Sweet booted two field goals, and Cutler kicked another before a Grey Cup touchdown drought spanning eight quarters between these teams was finally put to rest. Edmonton running back Angelo Santucci's fumble set up an Alouette scoring drive. Wade threw a seven-yard touchdown pass to Peter Dalla Riva to put the Alouettes ahead 23-6. Just prior to the start of the fourth quarter, Wade threw a 10-yard major to a wide-open John O'Leary, and the rout was on.

Cornerback Vernon Perry returned an interception 74 yards to help set up Wade's seven-yard touchdown pass to Bob Gaddis. Sweet added a single and field goal to complete the scoring. Sweet set a number of records in the game, including six field goals and 23 total points, records which still stand. This game marked the Alouettes' third and final championship of the 1970s. For the Eskimos, it marked their fourth loss in five trips to the final since 1960.

Ice Bowl

Although Olympic Stadium was designed to have a retractable roof, and a roof was added in 1987, the stadium was an open-air facility in November 1977. As is common in late November, Montreal received a fair amount of snow before game time.

Stadium crews put salt on the field to melt the snow. But when the temperature dropped on game day, the snow turned into a sheet of ice. The game was marred by several fumbles on otherwise routine snaps of the ball. However, the Alouettes had a competitive advantage: they affixed staples to the bottom of their sneakers to get traction on the slippery surface.  The Eskimos, using standard football cleats, never quite found their footing on the icy AstroTurf field (which had a carpet-like texture then, unlike modern artificial turf systems).

Tony Proudfoot, Alouette defensive back and the man largely responsible for perhaps the cleverest ploy in Grey Cup history:

Records 

 The game set a Grey Cup attendance record of 68,318 (which still stands as of 2022), even though it was a bitterly cold day and Montreal was in the midst of one of its frequent transit strikes. Local fans led the many football tourists to the game in a march across town, trekking from downtown to the east-end stadium on the morning of the game.
 Alouettes defensive back Vernon Perry's 4th quarter 74-yard interception return is the longest in Grey Cup history.
 Don Sweet's 23 points scored is still a single game Grey Cup record for most points in a championship game by a placekicker.
 Edmonton and Montreal have met in 11 Grey Cup clashes. The Eskimos prevailed in 1954, 1955, 1956, 1975, 1978, 1979, 2003 and 2005's overtime thriller. The Alouettes were victorious in 1974, the Ice Bowl of 1977, and 2002.
 This was the first of six consecutive Grey Cup appearances for the Eskimos, who would go on to win the next five CFL championships.
 The 1977 game was the first Grey Cup played at the new Montreal Olympic Stadium.

Box Score 

First Quarter

Montreal – FG – Don Sweet

Second Quarter

Montreal - FG - Don Sweet  
Montreal - FG - Don Sweet 
Montreal - FG - Don Sweet missed FG
Edmonton – FG – Dave Cutler

Third Quarter

Montreal – FG – Don Sweet 
Edmonton – FG – Dave Cutler 
Montreal – FG – Don Sweet 
Montreal – TD – Peter Dalla Riva 7 yard pass from Sonny Wade (Don Sweet convert)
Montreal – TD – John O'Leary 10 yard pass from Sonny Wade (Don Sweet convert)

Fourth Quarter

Montreal – TD – Bob Gaddis 7 yard pass from Sonny Wade (Don Sweet convert)
Montreal – Single – Montreal kick in End Zone 
Montreal – FG – Don Sweet

Further reading

External links

References

Grey Cup
Grey Cup
Grey Cups hosted in Montreal
Montreal Alouettes
Edmonton Elks
1970s in Montreal
1977 in Quebec
1977 in Canadian television
November 1977 sports events in Canada
Nicknamed sporting events